Herbie 'Tinker' Tonkes (4 April 1921 – 10 September 1991) was an Australian rules footballer who played for Essendon in the Victorian Football League (VFL) during the 1940s.

Tonkes could play a variety of positions, from defence, the wing to half back. He played his early football at Preston Juniors and was recruited to the VFL from Essendon United. War duties limited him to seven appearances in 1944 and he missed the entire 1945 season as he was serving in the Pacific. The following year he returned to the league and was a half back flanker in the victorious 1946 VFL Grand Final team. After one final season, Tonkes joined VFA club Brunswick.

References

Holmesby, Russell and Main, Jim (2007). The Encyclopedia of AFL Footballers. 7th ed. Melbourne: Bas Publishing.

1921 births
1991 deaths
Essendon Football Club players
Essendon Football Club Premiership players
Brunswick Football Club players
Australian rules footballers from Victoria (Australia)
One-time VFL/AFL Premiership players